Virginia Falls Water Aerodrome  is located on the South Nahanni River approximately  upstream from Virginia Falls, Northwest Territories, Canada. It is open from early May until mid-October.

References

Registered aerodromes in the Dehcho Region
Seaplane bases in the Northwest Territories